"Army of Lovers" is the debut single of Blue member Lee Ryan, released from his debut solo album, Lee Ryan (2005), on 18 July 2005. The song peaked at number three on the UK Singles Chart and achieved success worldwide, reaching number one in Italy and staying there for four weeks. It sold 20,000 copies in Italy during 2005.

Track listings
UK CD single 1 
 "Army of Lovers"
 "Army of Lovers" (acoustic version)

UK CD single 2 
 "Army of Lovers"4
 Album sampler ("Real Love" / "When I Think of You" / "Parking")
 "Army of Lovers" (video) – 3:00

Digital download
 "Army of Lovers" – 2:54
 "Army of Lovers" (acoustic version) – 2:55

Charts

Weekly charts

Year-end charts

References

2005 songs
2005 debut singles
Lee Ryan songs
Number-one singles in Italy
Sony BMG singles